The Warren Buffett Way, a book by author Robert Hagstrom, which outlines the business and investment principles of value investing practiced by American businessman and investor Warren Buffett.

Accolades
The first edition, published in 1994, sold over a million copies and spent 21 weeks on the New York Times Hardcover Nonfiction Best Seller list. A decade later, Hagstrom issued a second, expanded edition.

Chapters
The world's  greatest investor
The education of warren buffett
"Our main business is insurance": The early days of berkshire hathaway
Buying a business
Investing guidelines:business tenets
Investing guidelines:management tenets 
Investing guidelines:financial tenets
Investing guidelines:value tenets 
Investing in fixed-income securities
Managing your portfolio
The psychology of money
The unreasonable man

Principles
The principles included:
Purchase businesses with excellent long-term prospects
Purchase businesses at a large discount to their intrinsic value
Purchase businesses with a high return on invested capital
Purchase businesses with honest managers

References

1994 non-fiction books
Business books
Finance books
Wiley (publisher) books
Buffett family